Zeydabad (also Romanized as Zeydābād) is a village in Kork and Nartich Rural District, in the Central District of Bam County, Kerman Province, Iran. At the 2006 census, its population was 291, in 74 families.

References 

Populated places in Bam County